General Enrique Mosconi International Airport  is an international airport in the Chubut Province, Argentina serving Comodoro Rivadavia.

The airport is the main hub of Líneas Aéreas del Estado (LADE).

History
It was built in 1929, and was officially inaugurated with an Aeroposta Argentina flight between Bahía Blanca and Comodoro Rivadavia vía San Antonio Oeste and Trelew on 1 November 1929. The new terminal was constructed in 1952. The airport was named after the Argentine military engineer Enrique Mosconi.

Aeropuertos Argentina 2000 has been operating the airport since the early 2000s.

On 22 November 2017, the longest non-stop flight ever made by the Royal Air Force (RAF) of the United Kingdom landed at the airport. The flight was part of the RAF's support in the search for the ARA San Juan (S-42) submarine which had disappeared days before. This flight also marked the first time an RAF airplane had landed at the airport since the Falklands War era.

Airlines and destinations

Statistics

Accidents and incidents
1956: An Argentine Army Douglas C-54A, tail number CTA-4, was damaged beyond economical repair at the airport, under unspecified circumstances. There were no reported fatalities.
Despite the aircraft sustaining substantial damage, there were no reported fatalities among the six occupants.

See also

Transport in Argentina
List of airports in Argentina

References

External links
Aeropuertos Argentina 2000

Airports in Argentina